Pseudepaphra fuscovittata is a species of beetle in the family Cerambycidae, and the only species in the genus Pseudepaphra. It was described by Breuning in 1956.

References

Desmiphorini
Beetles described in 1956
Monotypic beetle genera